= Boxing exercise therapy for Parkinson's disease =

Non-contact boxing therapy

Boxing therapy for Parkinson's disease is a modified form of boxing specifically designed for individuals with Parkinson’s disease. It is a non-contact exercise program in which participants perform boxing techniques, coordination drills, and balance exercises without physical sparring. The method has gained international recognition as part of movement therapy for people with neurological conditions.

== Background ==
Parkinson’s disease often causes tremors, stiffness, and balance problems. While traditional physiotherapy focuses on mobility and strength, many patients seek engaging and functional forms of exercise. In the early 2000s, the concept of “non-contact boxing therapy” for people with Parkinson’s originated in the United States, inspired by the success of the Rock Steady Boxing program. The Rock Steady Boxing program also inspired a group of the same name in the United Kingdom.

== Effects ==
Research has shown that boxing-based exercise can have positive effects on both motor and non-motor symptoms of Parkinson’s disease. Studies report improvements in balance, coordination, gait speed, muscle tone, and self-confidence. In addition to physical benefits, participants often report enhanced self-esteem and a stronger sense of social connection.

== Implementation in the Netherlands ==
In the Netherlands, Parkinson boxing is offered by various specialized trainers and organizations. The training emphasizes non-contact boxing, rhythm, strength, coordination, and mental resilience. One of the initiatives offering this program is PowerHouze in Almere, where certified coaches combine Parkinson boxing with vitality training and the philosophy of movement as medicine.

A national overview of additional locations and certified trainers can be found through Parkinson Boxing Netherlands.

== See also ==
- Physiotherapy
- Exercise therapy
- Parkinson’s disease
- Neuroplasticity
